
Gmina Aleksandrów Łódzki is an urban-rural gmina (administrative district) in Zgierz County, Łódź Voivodeship, in central Poland.

Neighbouring gminas
Gmina Aleksandrów Łódzki is bordered by the towns of Konstantynów Łódzki, Łódź and Zgierz, and by the gminas of Dalików, Lutomiersk, Parzęczew and Zgierz.

Villages
The gmina contains the following villages having the status of sołectwo: Bełdów, Bełdów-Krzywa Wieś, Chrośno, Ciężków, Jastrzębie Górne, Kolonia Brużyca, Krzywiec, Księstwo, Brużyczka Mała, Nakielnica (sołectwo includes Karolew), Nowe Krasnodęby, Adamów (consists of Nowy Adamów and Stary Adamów), Prawęcice, Rąbień (includes Antoniew), Rąbień AB, Ruda Bugaj (includes Łobódź), Sanie, Słowak, Sobień, Stare Krasnodęby, Wola Grzymkowa (includes Budy Wolskie, Grunwald, Izabelin and Placydów), and Zgniłe Błoto.

References
 Polish official population figures 2006

Aleksandrow Lodzki
Zgierz County